Vonones II was a Parthian prince who ruled as king of Media Atropatene and briefly as king of the Parthian Empire.

Vonones was not from the ruling branch of the Arsacid royal family. His father was a Dahae prince, who was most likely descended from the former Arsacid monarch Mithridates II, whilst his mother was a daughter of the Arsacid King of Kings Phraates IV. Vonones II's brother was the Parthian King Artabanus II.

From about 11 AD until 51 AD, Vonones II ruled as king of Media Atropatene, a period about which little is known.

After the death of his nephew Gotarzes II, Vonones II became king of the Parthian Empire in 51 AD. However, he died a few months into his reign and was succeeded by his son, Vologases I. Tacitus wrote that Vonones II “knew neither success nor failure which have deserved to be remembered to him. It was a short and inglorious reign”.

Vonones II had 3 sons who, respectively, held the thrones of Parthia, Media Atropatene and Armenia: Pacorus, Vologases I, and Tiridates I.

References

Sources
 Josephus, Antiquities of the Jews, xx, 3, 4.
 Tacitus, Annals
 
 M. Bunson, A Dictionary of the Roman Empire, Oxford University Press, 1995
 W. Woodthorpe Tarn, The Greeks in Bactria and India, Cambridge University Press, 2010
  
 
 

51 deaths
1st-century Parthian monarchs
Rulers of Media Atropatene
Year of birth unknown
1st-century Iranian people
1st-century Babylonian kings